Maynak Bhandari was one of the first chiefs or Admiral of the Maratha Navy under Chhatrapati Shivaji Maharaj, and helped in both building the Maratha Navy and safeguarding the coastline of the emerging Maratha Empire. Under his leadership, Maratha navy won the battle at Khanderi fort near Alibaug against the British and Dutch combined troops . Along with Daria Sarang and Daulat Khan, another admirals who served Shivaji, Bhandari commanded a naval fleet of 200 ships. Their official titles of Mai Nayak Bhandari and Daria Sarang translate to Water Leader and Sea Captain, respectively. The Maratha Navy was the forerunner of India's present-day Indian Navy. A memorial has been built to Ram Nayak Bhandari at Bhatye Village, close to Ratnagiri town.

See also
 Shivaji
 Bhandaris

References

 

Maratha Navy
People from Maharashtra
People of the Maratha Empire
Naval history of India
Admirals
Indian military leaders